In July 2022, protests broke out in Panama. They were reportedly triggered by rising inflation, corruption, and a cost of living crisis. The economy has suffered as a result of the COVID-19 pandemic, and the Russo-Ukrainian War. On 18 July, Panama City saw the country's largest protest. President Laurentino Cortizo's government deal to cut fuel prices was rejected by trade unions. Protestors blocked sections of the transcontinental Pan-American Highway. On 27 July, security minister Juan Manuel Pino Forero said that the roads were clear for the first time. On 2 August, the teachers strike concluded.

See also
 2022 food crises
 2021–present global energy crisis
 List of protests in the 21st century

References

2022 protests
Protests
July 2022 events in North America
August 2022 events in North America